The Virtuous Model is a 1919 American silent drama film directed by Albert Capellani and starring Dolores Cassinelli, Helen Lowell, and May Hopkins.

The film's sets were designed by the French art director Henri Ménessier.

Cast
 Dolores Cassinelli as Denise Fleury  
 Helen Lowell as Mrs. Fleury  
 May Hopkins as Suzanne Carton 
 Vincent Serrano as Paul Brehant  
 Franklyn Farnum as Edward Dorin 
 Paul Doucet as Jacques Le Sage  
 Marie Chambers as Contess Olga Vosloff 
 Saville De Sacia 
 Albert Roccardi

Preservation
A copy of The Virtuous Model is in the George Eastman House Motion Picture Collection.

References

Bibliography
 Langman, Larry. Destination Hollywood: The Influence of Europeans on American Filmmaking. McFarland, 2000.

External links

1919 films
1919 drama films
1910s English-language films
American silent feature films
Silent American drama films
Films directed by Albert Capellani
American black-and-white films
American films based on plays
Pathé Exchange films
1910s American films